Ellen Aurora Ammann  (1 July 1870 - 23 November 1932) was a German politician and activist of Swedish origin, a representative of the Bavarian People's Party. Her cause for sainthood has been opened by the Roman Catholic Archdiocese of Munich and Freising.

Biography
Ellen Sundström was born in Stockholm, Sweden. She was the elder daughter of Carl Rudolf Sundström (1841-1889) and Carolina Sofia Häggström (1849–1943). Her father was an ornithologist and doctor of zoology. Her mother was a journalist and foreign editor with  Stockholms-Tidningen. She was the sister of Swedish landscape artist Harriet Sundström (1872–1961) .

After graduation, she began training as a physiotherapist. In 1890 Ellen Sundström married German orthopedist Ottmar Ammann (1861–1939) and then moved with her husband to Munich. She worked for Swedish-German women's rights, and was a welfare nurse and pioneer of professional training for social work. A Roman Catholic convert, in 1904 she co-founded the Munich branch of the German Catholic Women's Association.

From 1919 to 1932, she served as a "landtag" deputy for the Bavarian People’s Party, where she advocated the professionalisation of women's education. In January 1923, together with Anita Augspurg, Lida Gustava Heymann and a delegation of women, Amman called for Austrian born Adolf Hitler to be expelled from Germany. During the Beer Hall Putsch, she and several members of government hastily composed a condemnation of the attempted coup d'état. She continued to oppose National Socialism until her death. Ellen Ammann died in Munich during 1932 in the aftermath of a stroke. She was buried at Alter Südfriedhof.

See also
List of Bavarian People's Party politicians

References

Other sources 
 Adelheid Schmidt-Thomé  (2020) Ellen Ammann: Frauenbewegte Katholikin (Verlag Friedrich Pust) 
 Gunda Holtmann (2017) Ellen Ammann – Eine intellektuelle Biographie (Nomos Verlagsgesellschaft mbH & Co) 
 Marianne Neboisa (1992) Ellen Ammann, geb. Sundström 1870-1932. Dokumentation und Interpretation eines diakonischen Frauenlebens. (St. Ottilien) 
 
 Manfred Berger: Frauen in sozialer Verantwortung: Ellen Ammann. In: Unsere Jugend. 59 2007/H.4, S. 176-179

External links
Ellen Ammann Triade (Katholischer Deutscher Frauenbund) 
Schweden stammende Frauenrechtlerin Ellen Ammann (1870-1932) (Katholischer Deutscher Frauenbund) 

1870 births
1932 deaths
Politicians from Stockholm
Swedish emigrants to Germany
Swedish women's rights activists
Swedish Roman Catholics
German anti-fascists
Politicians from Bavaria
Bavarian People's Party politicians
Roman Catholic activists
20th-century venerated Christians
German Servants of God
Female anti-fascists